You're in My Heart: Rod Stewart with the Royal Philharmonic Orchestra is an album by British singer-songwriter Rod Stewart. It was released on 22 November 2019 by Warner Records. The album features Rod Stewart's "classic vocal tracks" accompanied by new arrangements by the Royal Philharmonic Orchestra. Also features 1971 chart toppers in both the UK and US "Maggie May" and "Reason to Believe". The release of You're In My Heart coincided with Stewart's biggest ever UK stadium tour throughout November and December 2019, a continuation of his hugely successful summer stadium tour. You're In My Heart also features "Stop Loving Her Today", a brand-new song, as well as a new recording of "It Takes Two" featuring Robbie Williams.

You're in My Heart  topped the UK Albums Chart, staying in the #1 position for three weeks and making it his tenth Number 1 album, and becoming Stewart's 38th top 10 album in the UK (including albums with Faces) and became the first UK number album one of the decade.

Track listing

Standard version

Deluxe version

Notes
  signifies a co-producer
  signifies an additional vocal producer

Charts

Weekly charts

Year-end charts

Certifications

References

2019 compilation albums
Rod Stewart albums
Albums produced by Trevor Horn
Warner Music Group compilation albums